J. Craig Fishel (born 1949 or 1950) is an American politician. He is a member of the Missouri House of Representatives from the 136th District, serving since 2019. He is a member of the Republican party.

References

Living people
1940s births
Republican Party members of the Missouri House of Representatives
21st-century American politicians